Route 4 is a national route of Uruguay. In 1975, it was assigned the name Andrés Artigas, a national hero of Uruguay. One fragment of it splits off Route 5 at Carlos Reyles of Durazno Department and ends at Route 20 in Río Negro Department, while a longer part starts off Route 90 in Paysandú Department near Guichón and connects with the city of Artigas in the north.

References

Roads in Uruguay